A bubo is a rounded swelling on the skin of a person afflicted by the bubonic plague.

Bubo may also refer to:

 Bubo (bird), the horned owl and eagle-owl genus
 Bubo, a Great Horned Owl in the Guardians of Ga'Hoole series
 Bubo, Duke of the Frisians (died 734)
 Bubo, a mechanical owl in the 1981 film Clash of the Titans
 Bubo, a Muppet owl on Barrio Sésamo
 Bubo, a character in the television series The Trap Door
Bubo, short for Buboicullaar, a Star Wars alien from Return of the Jedi who was later featured in Tales From Jabba's Palace as the star of one of many short stories